Plate may refer to:

Cooking 
 Plate (dishware), a broad, mainly flat vessel commonly used to serve food
 Plates, tableware, dishes or dishware used for setting a table, serving food and dining
 Plate, the content of such a plate (for example: rice plate)
 Plate, to present food, on a plate
 Plate, a forequarter cut of beef

Places 
 Plate, Germany, a municipality in Parchim, Mecklenburg-Vorpommern, Germany
 River Plate (disambiguation)
 Tourelle de la Plate, a lighthouse in France

Science and technology

Biology and medicine 
 Plate (anatomy), several meanings
 Dental plate, also known as dentures
 Dynamic compression plate, a metallic plate used in orthopedics to fix bone
 Microtiter plate (or microplate or microwell plate), a flat plate with multiple "wells" used as small test tubes
 Petri dish or Petri plate, a shallow dish on which biological cultures may be grown and/or viewed

Geology 
 Tectonic plate, are pieces of Earth's crust and uppermost mantle, together referred to as the lithosphere
 Plate tectonics, the study of the movement of such plates

Physics 
 Plate, a physical approximation of a theoretical plate in separation processes
 Plate electrode, a type of electrode used in vacuum tubes
 Plate (structure), a concept used in continuum mechanics as part of the plate theory
 Plate trick, a mathematical demonstration of quaternions and particle spins
 Wilhelmy plate, used to measure tension at an interface between air and a liquid or between two liquids

Construction 
 Anchor plate, a large plate connected to a tie rod or bolt for structural reinforcement
 Sill plate, the bottom horizontal member of a wall or building to which vertical members are attached
 Wall plate, a vertical component used in building construction

Electronics 
 Anodes, electrodes used in vacuum tubes (thermionic valves) and similar devices

Printing and photography 
 Photographic plate, a medium from which a photograph may be developed
Plate camera, an early type of camera that used photographic plates
 Printing plate, a printing medium:
 Plate, in Intaglio (printmaking), the direct opposite of a relief print
 Plate, in lithography, a method of printing originally based on the immiscibility of oil and water
 Plate, a (part of a) "tipped-in page", a separately-printed page in a book used to carry one or more images

Transportation 
 Approach plate, a chart used by a pilot to perform an instrument approach and landing on a runway
 Plate B, Plate C, ... , Plate H, different loading gauges used on North American railroads

Metal plates 
 Plate (metal), a rectangular flat metal stock that is more than 6 mm or 0.25 in thick, not as thin as sheet metal
 Plate, an element of a folding machine
 Plate armour, a body armor made from metal plates
 Vehicle registration plate (license plate), a sign attached to a vehicle in order to identify it
 L-plate (learner plate), a sign attached to a vehicle to indicate that the driver has a provisional driving license
 Plated, item with a deposition of metallic layers

Sport 
 Home plate, a location on a baseball field
 Several trophies, e.g.,
 Annapolis Subscription Plate, in horse racing
 County Championship Plate, in rugby union
 Mandela Challenge Plate, in rugby union
 Weight plate, a flat, heavy object, usually made of iron, used in strength training or weightlifting

Other uses 
 Plate (surname)
 Plate, in heraldry, a Roundel argent (white/silver)

See also 
 
 
 Basal plate (disambiguation)
 Faceplate (disambiguation)
 Home plate (disambiguation)
 Plat (disambiguation)